Steger is a village that straddles the border which separates Cook County and Will County, Illinois (Steger Road is the border line).

History 

Steger was founded in 1891 by Chicago real estate interests and initially named Columbia Heights in honor of the 1893 World's Columbian Exposition which the City of Chicago had been preparing to host since 1889. The character, financial fortunes and even the name of the community were set immediately thereafter when John Valentine Steger began to build a piano factory there on a parcel of land south of Chicago Heights that was sited immediately west of the Chicago and Eastern Illinois Railroad tracks and bordered by the tracks, Vincennes Avenue (now Chicago Road) and 33rd and 34th Streets. This first building of the complex replaced Steger's original factory which had adjoined his showrooms at Wabash Avenue and Jackson Boulevard in downtown Chicago, which had a capacity of only two pianos per week. This new building was three stories tall, 40 x 225 and designed by the Chicago architectural firm Mayo and Curry to accommodate 200 workers. By 1904 the factory at Steger had grown to cover twenty-three acres and had a capacity of sixteen thousand pianos per year. A piano by the company was displayed at the World's Columbian Exposition, and the instrument was commented on as follows:  Any work dealing with the Piano Industries of this country would be incomplete did it not contain a reference to the celebrated Steger. The particular excellence of the Steger piano consists of its fine quality of tone, seldom found in other high-grade instruments; it is very musical, liquid, round, sufficiently brilliant to satisfy the most fastidious taste. The very finest material obtainable is used in all parts of the Steger, the one aim being to obtain excellence in every feature -- tone, touch, appearance and durability. The name Steger upon the piano is sufficient guarantee of its superior worth. "The high-grade instrument makers were few, with names like Steger & Sons, Bush & Lane, Baldwin, Mason & Hamlin, Conover-Cable and of course Steinway & Sons. These pianos were among the best of the piano maker's art, instruments intended for artistic and professional use, but also for the drawing-rooms of the wealthy or the aspiring middle-class." The company built exceptionally high quality pianos under several names and in a wide range of prices. They are quite rare today. For a time after 1896, Steger & Sons shared this block with another piano factory which produced instruments for the Smith and Nixon Piano Manufacturing Company of Cincinnati.  For years after the community officially changed its name in 1896, Smith and Nixon continued to use the name Columbia Heights when referring to the location of its factory in Illinois. Smith and Nixon were gone from the area by 1911.

Steger was born in Ulm, Germany, on March 24, 1854, and had learned the art of cabinetmaking there before coming to the United States in 1871 with 12 cents in his pocket. He died on June 11, 1916, after having created over time the largest piano manufactory in the world, which at one time employed 1,400 persons. The Steger family remained active in the community for many years. John's grandson Robert M. Steger was the president of the village's Chamber of Commerce in 1953 and led an ambitious effort that year to work "for a greater Steger" 

The Village of Steger was incorporated in 1896 with 324 residents, at which time John Steger agreed to pay $400 toward incorporation costs with the understanding that the town would change its name to Steger, and he subsequently served two terms as the village's board president. He avoided the issues that had plagued George Pullman in his "model town" by encouraging private home ownership and commerce.  By 1920, Steger was considered by some to be the "piano capital of the world", producing more than a hundred pianos a day. After changing American tastes diminished the demand for the piano the plant closed its doors in 1928, and the Amico Macaroni Company of Chicago Heights moved into a portion of the vacated building. In 1932 another section of the complex became the home of the Steger Furniture Company, who manufactured radio cabinets there for many years.  In 1945, Steger Furniture was acquired by the automobile parts manufacturer Sparton Corporation, who had invented the first electric automobile horn in 1911 and the first all-electric radio after World War I. After a fire, the Steger Piano complex was demolished in the early 1970s.

Steger has been a regular stop on the annual "Driving the Dixie" event from the time it began.  The drive involves participants travelling down the historic Dixie Highway in the Chicago Southland and visiting various communities along the way.

Steger advertising & early views

Geography
Steger is located at  (41.4722472, -87.6177075).

Recreation
Steger has two main parks: Harold Hecht (Fireman's) Park and Veteran's Park.

Demographics
As of the 2020 census there were 9,584 people, 4,014 households, and 2,351 families residing in the village. The racial makeup of the village was 51.93% White, 26.46% African American, 0.53% Native American, 0.81% Asian, 0.03% Pacific Islander, 9.46% from other races, and 10.77% from two or more races. Hispanic or Latino of any race were 21.23% of the population.

There were 4,014 households, out of which 46.49% had children under the age of 18 living with them, 39.21% were married couples living together, 13.23% had a female householder with no husband present, and 41.43% were non-families. 34.98% of all households were made up of individuals, and 13.75% had someone living alone who was 65 years of age or older. The average household size was 3.07 and the average family size was 2.31.

The village's age distribution consisted of 22.1% under the age of 18, 9.7% from 18 to 24, 24% from 25 to 44, 26.3% from 45 to 64, and 17.8% who were 65 years of age or older. The median age was 41.5 years. For every 100 females, there were 117.7 males. For every 100 females age 18 and over, there were 112.1 males.

The median income for a household in the village was $49,492, and the median income for a family was $67,639. Males had a median income of $48,100 versus $29,272 for females. The per capita income for the village was $26,564. About 8.4% of families and 12.9% of the population were below the poverty line, including 18.0% of those under age 18 and 5.0% of those age 65 or over.

Note: the US Census treats Hispanic/Latino as an ethnic category. This table excludes Latinos from the racial categories and assigns them to a separate category. Hispanics/Latinos can be of any race.

Government
Steger is divided between two congressional districts. The area in Cook County is in Illinois's 2nd congressional district, while the area in Will County is in the 11th district.

Notable people
 Terry Boers, sports columnist and talk show host
 Luke Butkus, assistant coach for NFL's Jacksonville Jaguars and University of Illinois
 Flora Ciarlo, Illinois state legislator
 Louis Sherman, Steger Mayor (1973-2003) 
 Mike Downey, Los Angeles and Chicago newspaper columnist
 Debbie Halvorson, former United States Congresswoman
 John Holecek, linebacker for NFL's Buffalo Bills and San Diego Chargers

References

External links

Villages in Cook County, Illinois
Villages in Will County, Illinois
Villages in Illinois
Chicago metropolitan area
Populated places established in 1896
1896 establishments in Illinois
Majority-minority cities and towns in Cook County, Illinois
Majority-minority cities and towns in Will County, Illinois